The northern yellow-black triplefin (Enneapterygius gracilis), also known as the northern Australian yellow-black triplefin, is a species of triplefin blenny in the genus Enneapterygius. It was described by German Ichthyologist Ronald Fricke in 1994. It is a tropical blenny, endemic to northern Australia, in the western Pacific and southeastern Indian Oceans. Male northern yellow-black triplefins can reach a maximum length of 2.8 centimetres (1.06 inches).

References

Northern yellow-black triplefin
Fish described in 1994
Northern Australia